Stylidium alsinoides is a dicotyledonous plant that belongs to the genus Stylidium (family Stylidiaceae). Obovate or elliptical leaves, about 20–100 per plant, are scattered along the elongate, glabrous stems. The bracts on the inflorescence can be as large as leaves and may be hard to distinguish them except for their growth habit: the leaves are alternate whereas the bracts are opposite.

This species lacks a scape. S. alsinoides'''s distribution ranges from northern Queensland in Australia north to the island of Luzon in the Philippines and southern parts of Sulawesi in New Guinea. In Australia its typical habitat has been reported as a sandy soil in swamps that are dominated by Melaleuca quinquenervia, but has also been found on creekbanks with Melaleuca leucadendra or in some of the wetter rock crevices. S. alsinoides is most closely related to S. fluminense''.

Its conservation status has been assessed as data deficient.

See also 
 List of Stylidium species

References 

Asterales of Australia
Carnivorous plants of Asia
Carnivorous plants of Australia
Flora of Queensland
Flora of New Guinea
Flora of the Philippines
alsinoides
Plants described in 1810